Nationality words link to articles with information on the nation's poetry or literature (for instance, Irish or France).

Events
 May – "La nuit de la poésie", a poetry reading in Montreal bringing together poets from French Canada to recite before an audience of more than 2,000 in the Théâtre du Gesu, lasting until 7 a.m.
 Release of Tomfoolery, an animated film directed by Joy Batchelor and John Halas, based on the nonsense verse of Edward Lear (especially "The Courtship of the Yonghy-Bonghy-Bo") and Lewis Carroll
 First issue of Tapia (later named the Trinidad & Tobago Review) published
 In the United Kingdom, "My Enemies Have Sweet Voices", a poem by Pete Morgan, is set to music by Al Stewart and included in his "Zero She Flies" album this year.

Works published in English
Listed by nation where the work was first published and again by the poet's native land, if different; substantially revised works listed separately:

Australia
 Robert Adamson Canticles on the Skin
 B. Elliott and A. Mitchell, Bards in the Wilderness: Australian Colonial Poetry to 1920, anthology
 John Tranter, Parallax, South Head Press

Canada
 Earle Birney, Rag & Bone Shop. Toronto: McClelland and Stewart).
 Joan Finnigan, It Was Warm and Sunny When We Set Out
 Gail Fox, Dangerous Season
 R.A.D. Ford, The Solitary City, his poems and translations from Russian and Portuguese
 John Glassco, Memoirs of Montparnasse
 Michael Ondaatje:
 The Collected Works of Billy the Kid: Left-handed Poems (adapted by Ondaatje into a play of the same name in 1973), Toronto: Anansi  ; New York: Berkeley, 1975
 Leonard Cohen (literary criticism), Toronto: McClelland & Stewart
Joe Rosenblatt, Bumblebee Dithyramb.

Anthologies in Canada
 Robert Evans, editor, Song to a Seagull, collected Canadian songs and poems
 John Glassco, editor, The Poetry of French Canada in Translation, translated by English-speaking poets, including E. J. Pratt, Al Purdy, Leonard Cohen; and poetic lyrics from recent songs
 Raymond Souster and Douglas Lochhead, eds. New Poems of the Seventies. Ottawa: Oberon Press.
Raymond Souster  and Douglas Lochhead, eds. Made in Canada. Ottawa: Oberon Press, 1970.
 Raymond Souster and Richard Woollatt, eds. Generation Now. Longman Canada.

India in English
 Shiv Kumar, Articulate Silences ( Poetry in English ), Calcutta: Writers Workshop, India .
 Keki N. Daruwalla, Under Orion ( Poetry in English ), Calcutta: Writers Workshop, India . also New Delhi: Harper Collins Publishers India Pvt Ltd.;
 Sukanta Chaudhuri, The Glass King and Other Poems ( Poetry in English ), Calcutta: Writers Workshop, India .
 Gauri Deshpande, Lost Love ( Poetry in English ),
 Suniti Namjoshi, More Poems( Poetry in English ),
 Roshen Alkazi, Seventeen More Poems ( Poetry in English ), Calcutta: Writers Workshop, India . (see also Seventeen Poems 1965)
 Margaret Chatterjee, Towards the Sun ( Poetry in English ), Calcutta: Writers Workshop, India .
 Mary Ann Das Gupta, The Peacock Smiles ( Poetry in English ), Calcutta: Writers Workshop, India .
 N. Prasad, Iconography of Time, Calcutta: Writers Workshop, India .
 Monika Varma, Green Leaves & Gold ( Poetry in English ), Calcutta: Writers Workshop, India .

Ireland
 Leland Bardwell, The Mad Cyclist
 Seamus Heaney, Northern Ireland poet published in the United Kingdom:
 Night Drive, Gilbertson
 A Boy Driving His Father to Confession, Sceptre Press
 Derek Mahon, Beyond Howth Head, Northern Ireland poet published in the United Kingdom

New Zealand
 James K. Baxter, Jerusalem Sonnets
 Bill Manhire, Malady
 F. McKay, New Zealand Poetry, scholarship
 Vincent O'Sullivan, editor, An Anthology of Twentieth Century New Zealand Verse
 J. E. Weir, The Poetry of James K. Baxter, a critical study

United Kingdom

 Dannie Abse, Selected Poems
 Margaret Atwood, The Journals of Susanna Moodie
 George Barker, At Thurgarton Church
 R. H. Bowden, Poems from Italy
 Frederick Broadie, My Findings
 Michael Dennis Browne, The Wife of Winter
 Charles Causley, Figgie Hobbin
 Donald Davie, Six Epistles to Eva Hesse
 C. Day-Lewis, The Whispering Roots
 Patric Dickinson, More Than Time
 Clifford Dyment, Collected Poems
 D.J. Enright, Selected Poems
 W.S. Graham, Malcolm Mooney's Land
 Ian Hamilton, The Visit
 Tony Harrison, The Loiners
 Seamus Heaney, Northern Ireland poet published in the United Kingdom:
 Night Drive, Gilbertson
 A Boy Driving His Father to Confession, Sceptre Press
 Glyn Hughes, Neighbours
 Ted Hughes, Crow
 C. Day-Lewis, The Whispering Roots
 George MacBeth, The Burning Cone
 Norman MacCaig, A Man in My Position
 Hugh MacDiarmid, Selected Poems
 Sorley MacLean, George Campbell Hay, William Neill and Stuart MacGregor, Four Points of a Saltire (includes some poems in Scottish Gaelic)
 Derek Mahon, Beyond Howth Head Northern Ireland poet published in the United Kingdom
 Walter de la Mare, The Complete Poems of Walter de la Mare
 Stuart Montgomery, Circe
 Brian Patten, The Homecoming
 Christopher Pilling, Snakes and Girls, won the new Poets Award sponsored by Leeds university and the Yorkshire Post
 Peter Porter, The Last of England
 Burns Singer, Collected Poems (posthumous)
 Iain Crichton Smith, Selected Poems
 Charles Tomlinson, The Way of a World
 John Wain, Letters to Five Artists
 Ted Walker, The Night Bathers
 Hugo Williams, Sugar Daddy
 Mary Wilson (wife of Prime Minister Harold Wilson), Selected Poems, "easily the 'best selling'" poetry book of the year.
 Clive Young, Ashdragons, Flowerdeath and Sun

Anthologies in the United Kingdom
 Alan Bold, editor, The Penguin Book of Socialist Verse
 Peter Robins, editor, Doves for the Seventies
 Edward Lucie-Smith, editor, British Poetry since 1945, Penguin (2nd edition 1985)
 F.E.S. Finn, editor, Poems of the Sixties
 Howard Sergeant, editor, Poetry of the 1940s

United States
 A.R. Ammons, Uplands
 John Ashbery, The Double Dream of Spring
 Paul Blackburn:
 The Assassination of President McKinley
 Three Dreams and an Old Poem
 Gin: Four Journal Pieces
 Louise Bogan, A Poet's Alphabet
 Philip Booth, Margins
 Stanley Burnshaw, The Seamless Web
 Gwendolyn Brooks, Family Pictures
 Raymond Carver, Winter Insomnia
 J. P. Clark, Casualties: Poems 1966–68, Nigerian poet published in the United States
 Clark Coolidge, Space, Harper & Row
 L. Sprague de Camp, Demons and Dinosaurs
 James Dickey, The Eye-Beaters, Blood, Victory, Madness, Buckhead and Mercy
 Ed Dorn:
 Gunslinger I & II, Fulcrum Press
 Songs Set Two: a Short Count, Frontier Press, 
 Michael S. Harper, Dear John, Dear Coultrane, nominated for the National Book Award
 John Hollander, Images of Voice, criticism
 David Ignatow, Poems: 1934-1969
 LeRoi Jones, It's Nation Time
 Shirley Kaufman, the Floor Keeps Turning
 Denise Levertov, Relearning the Alphabet
 William Meredith, Earth Walk
 W. S. Merwin:
 The Carrier of Ladders, New York: Atheneum (awarded the Pulitzer Prize for Poetry in 1971)
 Signs, with graphics by A. D. Moore; Iowa City, Iowa: Stone Wall Press
 Lorine Niedecker, My Life by Water: Collected Poems, 1936-1968 (Fulcrum Press)
 Michael Ondaatje, The Collected Works of Billy the Kid
 Ezra Pound's Drafts and Fragments of Cantos CX to CXVII
 Mark Strand, Darker, Canadian native living in and published in the United States
 May Swenson, Iconographs
 Mona Van Duyn, To See, To Take
 Reed Whittemore, Fifty Poems Fifty
 William Carlos Williams, Imaginations (posthumous)

Other in English
 J. P. Clark, Casualties: Poems 1966–68, Nigerian poet published in the United States

Works published in other languages
Listed by nation where the work was first published and again by the poet's native land, if different; substantially revised works listed separately:

Arabic language
 Nizar Qabbani, Syrian:
 Savage Poems
 Book of Love
 100 Love Letters

Denmark
 Thorkild Bjørnvig, a book of "collected or selected works"
 Regin Dahl, Ærinde uden betydning
 Ivan Malinovski, a book of "collected or selected works"
 Jess Ørnsbo, a book of "collected or selected works"
 Klaus Rifbjerg, Mytologi, Denmark

French language

Canada
 Gaston Miron, L'Homme Rapaillé
 Yves Préfontaine:
 Débâcle
 À l'Orée des travaux
 Fernand Dumont, Parler de septembre
 Raoul Duguay, Manifeste de l'Infonie
 Nicole Brossard, Suite logique
 Louis-Philippe Hébert, Les Mangeurs de terre

France
 M. Béalu, La Nuit nous garde
 Alain Bosquet and Pierre Seghers, Poèmes de l'année
 L. Brauquier, Feux d'épaves
 Mohammed Dib, Formulaires
 Emily Dickinson, Poésies complètes, translated from the original English by Guy Jean Forgue; Aubier-Flammarion
 Pierre Emmanuel, pen name of Noël Mathieu, Jacob
 Andre Frenaud, Depuis toujours déja
 Eugene Guilleveic, Paroi
 Michel Leiris, Mots sans mémoire
 C. Le Quintrec, La Marche des arbres
 M. Manoll, Incarnada
 J.L. Moreau, Sous le masque des mots
 J. Tardieu, Poèmes à jouer
 Vandercammen, Horizon de la vigie

Germany
 Paul Celan, Lightduress (Lichtzwang, Romanian, writing in German)

Hebrew
 M. Temkin, Shirai Yerushalayim
 A. Broides, Tahana ve-Derech
 Z. Gilead, Or Hozer
 Dan Pagis, Gilgul ("Transformations")
 I. Shalev, Naar Shav Min ha-Tzava
 Abba Kovner, Hupahba-Midbar
 T. Carmi, Davar Ahed
 Avot Yeshurun, Ze Shaim ha-Sefere

Italy
 Carmelo Bene, L'orecchio mancante
 Dino Buzzati, Poema a fumetti
 Alfredo Giuliani, Il tautofono
 Sandro Penna, Tutte le poesie
 Nelo Risi, Di certe cose
 Maria Luisa Spaziani, L'occhio del ciclone
 Giovanni Testori, Erodiade

Norway
 Rolf Jacobsen, Headlines
 Stein Mehren, Aurora
 Ragnvald Skrede, Lauvfall
 Simen Skjønsberg, Flyttedag
 Tarjei Vesaas, Liv ved straumen (posthumous)

Portuguese language

Brazil
 Augusto de Campos, Equivocábulos, collection of "semantic-visual texts, photo-poems, and 'Viagem via linguagem', a collapsible environment-poem resembling an architect's model"
 Affonso Avila, Código de Minas
 Silviano Santiago, Salto

Russian
 Andrei Voznesenski, The Shadow of Sound
 Y. Smelyakov, December
 Boris Slutski, Tales for Today
 Evgeni Vinokurov, Shows
 Leonid Martynov, Peoples' Names
 Leonid Vasilyev, Ognevistsa
 Evgeni Yevtushenko, a collection, including some new poems and omitting some "controversial earlier ones"

Spanish language

Spain
 Jorge Guillén, Obra poética
 José Caballero Bonald, Vivar para contarlo ("Live to Tell It"), including "Zauberlehrling"

Peru
 Washington Delgado, Un mundo dividado
 C.G. Belli, Sextinas
 J.G. Rose, Informe al rey
 M. Martos, Cuaderno de quejas y contentamientos
 C. Bustamante, El nombre de las cosas

Elsewhere in Latin America
 Julio Cortázar, Último round, miscellany of stories, poems, essays and collage games (Argentina)
 Alberto Girri, Antología temática (Argentina)
 Alberto Vanasco, Canto rodado (Argentina)
 I. López Vallecillo, Puro asombro (El Salvador)
 Ernesto Cardenal, Salmos (Nicaragua)
 R. Fernández Retamar, Que veremos arder (Cuba)
 Nicanor Parra, Obra gruesa (Chile)
 Enrique Lihn, La musiquilla de las pobres esferas (Chile)

Sweden
 Werner Aspenström, Inre ("Inner")
 Gören Sonnevi, Det Måste gå ("It Must Be Possible")
 Maja Ekelöf, Rapport från en skurhink ("Report from a Scrub Bucket")
 Henry Olsson, Vinlövsranka och hagtornskrans, a study of the poet Gustaf Fröding (died 1911)

Yiddish

Israel
 Abraham Sutzkever, Ripened Faces
 Yaakov Zvi Shargel, Sunny Doorsteps
 Aryeh Shamri, Song in the Barn
 David Rodin, Young and Younger, for young readers
 Leizer Eichenrand, Thirst for Duration

United States
 Joseph Rubeinstein, Exodus from Europe, third volume of a narrative trilogy
 Wolf Pasmanik, My Poems
 Kadya Molodovsky, Marzipans, for children and adults
 Moshe Shifris, Under One Roof

Elsewhere
 Melekh Ravitch, Post Scriptus (Canada)
 Jacob Sternberg, Poem and Ballad on the Carpathians (France)
 Izzy Kharik, With Body and Life (Russia)

Other languages
 Luo Fu, River Without Banks, Chinese (Taiwan)
 Rituraj, Kitna Thora Waqt; India, Hindi-language

Awards and honors

Canada
 See 1970 Governor General's Awards for a complete list of winners and finalists for those awards.

United Kingdom
 Cholmondeley Award: Kathleen Raine, Douglas Livingstone, Edward Brathwaite
 Eric Gregory Award: Helen Frye, Paul Mills, John Mole, Brian Morse, Alan Perry, Richard Tibbitts
 Queen's Gold Medal for Poetry: Roy Fuller

United States
 Consultant in Poetry to the Library of Congress (later the post would be called "Poet Laureate Consultant in Poetry to the Library of Congress"): William Stafford appointed this year.
 Pulitzer Prize for Poetry: Richard Howard, Untitled Subjects
 National Book Award for Poetry: Elizabeth Bishop, The Complete Poems
 Fellowship of the Academy of American Poets: Howard Nemerov

France
 Prix Max Jacob: Daniel Boulanger for Tchadiennes and Retouches
 French Academy's Grand Prix de Poèsie: Jean Follain

Soviet Union
 Lenin Prize: Nikolai Tikhonov

Births
 February 27 – Rachel Mann, English trans woman poet and Anglican priest
 September 10 – Phaswane Mpe (died 2004), South African novelist and poet
 September 16 – Nick Sagan, American poet, novelist and screenwriter
 September 24 – Gemma Moraleja Paz, Spanish poet and novelist
 Also:
 Malika Booker, British poet
 Victoria Chang, American poet
 Tim Kendall, English poet, editor, critic and academic
 David Roderick, American poet
 Faruk Šehić, Bosnian poet and fiction writer
 Brenda Shaughnessy, Japanese-born American poet

Deaths

Birth years link to the corresponding "[year] in poetry" article:
 January 10 – Charles Olson, 59 (born 1910), American poet, of cancer
 January 15 – Leah Goldberg, 58 (born 1911), Israeli poet who wrote in Hebrew
 January 24 – Caresse Crosby, also known as "Mary Phelps Jacob", 78 (born 1891), American poet and New York socialite, who, in 1927, founded Black Sun Press with her husband Harry Crosby (also a poet) and who in 1910 invented the first modern bra to receive a patent and gain wide acceptance
 February 4 – Louise Bogan, 72 (born 1897), American poet, United States Poet Laureate
 February 19 – Edsel Ford, 41 (born 1928), American poet
 March 26 – Rosa Zagnoni Marinoni, 82 (born 1888), American poet
 March 28 – Nathan Alterman, 59 (born 1910), Israeli poet, journalist and translator
 March 29 – Vera Brittain, 76 (born 1893) English novelist and poet
 about April 20 – Paul Celan, 49 (born 1920), Romanian-born poet who wrote in German and became a French citizen, suicide
 May 12 – Nelly Sachs, 78 (born 1891), German-Swedish poet and dramatist who won the Nobel Prize for Literature in 1966
 June 2 – Giuseppe Ungaretti, 82 (born 1888), Italian modernist poet, journalist, essayist, critic and academic
 June 18 – N. P. van Wyk Louw, 64 (born 1906), South African Afrikaans poet and critic
 July 3 – James Douglas Morrison, 27
 August 18 – Humayun Kabir (Bengali: হুমায়ুন কবির), 63 (born 1906), Bengali poet, educationist, politician, writer and philosopher
 September 23 – John Gawsworth, 58 (born 1912), English poet, anthologist, Fitzrovian and King Juan I of Redonda
 September 28 – John Dos Passos, 74 (born 1896), American novelist, poet and artist
 November 25 – Yukio Mishima 三島 由紀夫, pen name of Kimitake Hiraoka 平岡 公威, 45 (born 1925), Japanese author, poet and playwright, by public ritual suicide
 December 11 – Arthur Nortje, 27 (born 1942), South African poet, of a drug overdose
 December 31 – Lorine Niedecker, 67 (born 1903), American Objectivist poet

Notes and references
 1971 Britannica Book of the Year (covering events of 1970), "Literature" article and "Obituaries of 1970" article; source of many of the books in the "Works published" list and some deaths.
 Lal, P., Modern Indian Poetry in English: An Anthology & a Credo, Calcutta: Writers Workshop, second edition, 1971 (however, on page 597 an "editor's note" states contents "on the following pages are a supplement to the first edition" and is dated "1972"); hereafter: "P. Lal (1971)"

See also

 Poetry
 List of poetry awards
 List of years in poetry

20th-century poetry
Poetry